The Robert V. Denney Federal Building and U.S. Courthouse is a modern, five-story steel structure in Lincoln, Nebraska. The building is named after the late U.S. District Court judge and U.S. House of Representatives member. The U.S. Department of Agriculture, judiciary, and district courts serve as the building's primary tenants.

References

Buildings and structures in Lincoln, Nebraska
Courthouses in Nebraska